Bush's Chicken (stylized as Bush's Chicken!) is a fast food restaurant serving fried chicken. The company is headquartered in Waco, Texas and has over 75 franchise locations in Central, North, South, and West Texas. The chain serves fried chicken, fried okra, fries, mashed potatoes, corn nuggets, jalapeño poppers, yeast rolls and macaroni and cheese. Bush's Chicken also sells sweet and unsweet iced tea by the gallon jug.

History

The first Bush's Chicken was opened in 1996 in Waco, Texas by Keith Bush. The chain was sold to Hammock Partners, L.L.C. in 2005. The headquarters was moved to Austin that same year. In 2011 Keith Bush's son, Corey Bush, purchased three of the chain's restaurants. After a change in ownership in 2015, headquarters relocated back to Waco.

In December 2012 the restaurant was hit with a lawsuit. The customer accused the restaurant of serving her husband tainted chicken from which he died.  Bush's was later cleared of wrongdoing based on medical evidence presented at the trial. 

Corey Bush filed for bankruptcy in Texas Western Bankruptcy Court in 2018

See also
List of fast-food chicken restaurants
List of fast food restaurant chains

References

External links

Fast-food poultry restaurants
Fast-food chains of the United States
Fast-food franchises
Restaurants in Texas
Regional restaurant chains in the United States
Companies based in Austin, Texas
1996 establishments in Texas
Restaurants established in 1996
Companies that filed for Chapter 11 bankruptcy in 2018

Chicken chains of the United States